Yıldız Palace is a vast complex of former imperial Ottoman pavilions and villas in Beşiktaş, Istanbul, Turkey, built in the 19th and early 20th centuries. It was used as a residence by the sultan and his court in the late 19th century.

Origin 
Yıldız Palace, meaning "Star Palace", was built in 1880 and was used by the Ottoman Sultan Abdülhamid II. The area of the palace was originally made of natural woodlands and became an imperial estate during the reign of Sultan Ahmed I (1603–1617). Various sultans after Ahmed I enjoyed vacationing on these lands and Sultans Abdülmecid I and Abdülaziz built mansions here. The Yildiz Palace was a complex over a large area of hills and valleys. This was an example of traditional Ottoman architecture consisting of a complex of different buildings across a piece of land.

The first pavilion was built by Sultan Selim III from 1798 to 1808, for his mother, Mihrişah Sultan. In the 1870s, the surrounding area of the palaces were a series of isolated pavilions in a wooded setting.

In the late 19th century, Sultan Abdülhamid II left Dolmabahçe Palace because he feared a seaside attack on the palace, which is located at the shore of the Bosporus strait. He expanded the Yıldız Palace and ordered the renowned Italian architect Raimondo D'Aronco to build new buildings to the palace complex. When he moved there, the palace became the fourth seat of Ottoman government (the previous ones were the Eski Saray (Old Palace) in Edirne, and the Topkapı Palace and Dolmabahçe Palaces in Istanbul.

Layout 
The palace is a complex of buildings including the State Apartments Büyük Mabeyn, Şale Pavilion, the Malta Pavilion, the Çadır Pavilion, the Yıldız Theater and Opera House, the Yıldız Palace Museum, and the Imperial Porcelain Factory. The Yıldız Palace Gardens are also a popular public site among the residents of Istanbul. A bridge connects the Yıldız Palace with the Çırağan Palace on the Bosporus through this garden.

The Yildiz Palace is separated into three courtyards. The first courtyard is where the Sultan and his leaders would govern, which makes sense because the palace served as the fourth seat of Ottoman government. In this courtyard, one may find offices for governing officials, the extensive library of Sultan Abdulhamid II, and an armory. In the second courtyard was the private living area for the Sultan and his family. The third courtyard was where the outer gardens were. These gardens included some of the rarest plants and flowers at the request of Sultan Abdulhamid II. Also, the third courtyard is where the Yildiz Tile Factory was located as well. There, the Ottomans created tiles and other forms of art like vases from porcelain.

State apartments 
Government officials working for Abdülhamid II had their offices in this building.

Şale Kiosk 

The sultan's residence was in the Şale Kiosk or pavilion. The building has two floors and a basement and constructed from a mix of wood and stone. It was constructed in three phases. The first part was built in the 1870s and was designed to resemble a Swiss chalet, hence the name Şale. Winston Churchill and Charles de Gaulle were among the visitors to this part of the palace. The second section was added in 1889 to accommodate Kaiser Wilhelm II, who was the first foreign monarch to visit Constantinople. It was during this phase that the Sedefli Salon Mother-of-Pearl Salon was added. The name derives from the extensive use of mother-of-pearl that covered almost all of its surfaces. There are also detailed painted landscapes on the ceiling. The third section was also built for Kaiser Wilhelm II in 1898. The reception chamber was built during this period and remains the most impressive room in the entire Şale Pavilion. There is a single carpet on the floor that has an area greater than 400 square meters and was hand woven by 60 weavers. Elegant features of the chamber include a gilded, coffered ceiling and large mirrors. Abdülhamid II was a skilled carpenter and actually made some of the pieces of furniture that can be found in the Şale Pavilion.

Malta Kiosk 

The Malta Kiosk, designed by the architect Sarkis Balyan, is a pavilion located in Yıldız Park to the north side of the wall separating Yıldız Palace. There are also two watching and resting pavilions in the grove being the rear garden of Çırağan Palace from the Abdül Aziz I period. The origin of the name is not certain: during the Ottoman era certain parts of palaces were called after the names of conquered places or important battles, so this name is given after the Siege of Malta 1565 siege of Malta; a siege that the Ottoman Empire lost to the Knights of Malta. Malta was never conquered by the Ottoman Turks.

The trial of Midhat Pasha took place in a tent behind the pavilion.

Çadır Kiosk 

It was built by Sultan Abdülaziz (1861–76), who used them as prisons. Today it houses a café and restaurant.

Yıldız Theatre and Opera House 
Built by Sultan Abdülhamid II in 1889, it has stars on its domed ceiling, a reference to the name of the Yıldız Palace, which means Star Palace. Because no one was allowed to have his back to the sultan, the position of the sultan's balcony box meant that the first row seats were never used.

Yıldız Palace Museum 
This used to be Sultan Abdülhamid II's carpentry workshop who was influenced for carpentry by Prophet Hadhrat Nuh A.S and is now used to display art and objects from the palace.

Imperial Porcelain Factory 

Opened in 1895, the factory was constructed to meet the demand of the upper classes for European-style ceramics. The bowls, vases and plates it produced often pictured idealized scenes of the Bosphorus. The building has an interesting appearance in that it resembles a European medieval castle.

Present use 
After the Ottoman Empire ended, the palace was used as a luxury casino before being converted into a guest house for visiting heads of state and royalty. Today it is a museum and its gardens can be used for private receptions, such as the Istanbul Antiques Fair at the Silahhane (Armoury) Hall, which usually takes place in November. The Istanbul office of the OIC is also located within the Yıldız Palace.

The palace is in the Beşiktaş district of Istanbul. It is no longer open to the public and no longer a museum. It is now used by the president.

Gallery

See also 
 Yıldız Clock Tower
 Yıldız Hamidiye Mosque
 Yıldız Park

References

Literature 
 Önder Küçükerman, Nedret Bayraktar, Semra Karakaţli. Yıldız Porcelain in National Palaces Collection. TBMM, Istanbul, 1998.
 Vahide Gezgör, Feryal Irez. Yıldız Palace Chalet Kasr-ı Hümayunu. TBMM, Istanbul, 1993.

External links 

 Directorate of National Palaces: Yıldız Palace website
 Picture gallery of park and palace
 Eyewitness Travel Guides: Istanbul. 124-125
 Points from Turkey

 
Beşiktaş
Tourism in Istanbul
Historic house museums in Turkey
World Heritage Tentative List for Turkey